Ocean Beach is a long sandy beach which runs along the Pacific Ocean coast of south Dunedin, New Zealand. It stretches for some three kilometres from Saint Clair in the southwest along the coast of Saint Kilda to the foot of Lawyers Head in the east. The beach is a popular recreation area for swimming, surfing, and walking.

Geography

The beach is divided into three roughly equal lengths, known as Saint Clair Beach, Middle Beach, and Saint Kilda Beach. Access is easiest at the Saint Clair end, with steps and ramps down to the beach from Saint Clair Esplanade. The esplanade is the site of several cafes and restaurants. At its end, also the western end of the beach, is the Saint Clair salt-water swimming pool, the city’s oldest pool, opened in 1884. The pool has been upgraded on several occasions, most recently in 2002. A short walking track leads southwest from the pool to Second Beach, a small stony beach sitting at the bottom of the basalt cliffs of Forbury Head.

Saint Clair Beach is a popular surfing venue, as well as having a patrolled swimming area. Shark nets have been deployed one kilometre out from the beach every summer since 1970, making this a safe swimming area. Major surf lifesaving and surfing championships are regularly hosted at Saint Clair Beach. The western end of Saint Clair Beach is marked by a series of old wooden posts, the remains of an old breakwater groyne. These posts are often erroneously thought by to be the remains of a jetty. During the Victorian and Edwardian eras, there were several groynes along the beach which protected it from erosion. The groynes have fallen into disrepair since that time, with only a handful of posts from the last groyne remaining in place.

The other major access-point to the beach is at Saint Kilda, where a sandy slope leads down to the sea from the road. Here, too, is a patrolled swimming area. Between the two access points is Middle Beach. This is backed by a series of high dunes topped by a walkway linking Saint Clair Esplanade with the Sir James Barnes Lookout, which offers views across south Dunedin from above Forbury Park Raceway. Behind these dunes are several of the city’s sports grounds, notably Kettle Park. The Ocean Beach Railway runs through these parks from the Otago Model Engineering Club’s premises close to the Saint Kilda beach access point.

In recent years the dunes have been subject to severe erosion, and measures have been taken by the Dunedin City Council to reinforce them. This is not the first time that erosion has threatened properties along this stretch of Dunedin’s coast. Heavy seas during the 1890s and early 1900s caused loss of land close to Saint Clair, and the current esplanade is sited along the line of the first sea wall to be built along this stretch of coast, built between 1911 and 1913.

Wildlife
Despite being a well-frequented beach within an urban area, Ocean Beach is regularly visited by a wide array of wildlife. Both seals and sea lions are occasional visitors, as are blue penguins.

See also
White Island, Otago
Tunnel Beach

References

Further reading
Newton, B.A. (2003) Our St. Clair. Dunedin: Kenmore Productions.

Geography of Dunedin
Beaches of Otago
Surfing locations in New Zealand
Tourist attractions in Dunedin